Clapham South is a station on London Underground's Northern line between  and Balham. The station is located at the corner of Balham Hill (A24) and Nightingale Lane, at the southern edge of Clapham Common. It is in both Travelcard Zone 2 and Travelcard Zone 3.

History
The station was designed by Charles Holden and was opened on 13 September 1926 as the first station of the Morden extension of the City and South London Railway, which is now part of the Northern line. Other proposed names for the station prior to opening were "Balham North" and "Nightingale Lane".

The apartments above the station, named Westbury Court, were a later addition, built in the mid-1930s. The parade of shops along Balham Hill was extended as part of the same development using the same style as the original three closest to the station.

The station was refurbished in the 1990s, with new flooring, tiling and CCTV - albeit ensuring that original Charles Holden features were restored or reproduced. The restoration work was awarded a National Railway Heritage Award.

It is one of eight London Underground stations with a deep-level air-raid shelter underneath it. In 1948, the deep shelter was used as temporary accommodation for immigrants from the West Indies. The  arrived at Tilbury in 1948 carrying 492 immigrants. London had a severe labour shortage after the war and the Colonial Office had sought to recruit a labour force from Jamaica. An advertisement had appeared in Jamaica's Daily Gleaner on 13 April 1948 offering transport to the UK. The Windrush was quickly filled. As there was no accommodation for all of the new arrivals, the Colonial Office housed many of them temporarily in the deep-level shelter at Clapham South. 

The underground shelter has been available to visit through London Transport Museum's Hidden London programme of guided tours since 2016.

Connections
The station is served by London Buses routes 50, 155, 249, 355, G1, 690, and also by night route N155.

References

Gallery

External links

London Transport Museum Photographic Archive

CharlesHolden.com Early photograph of station

Northern line stations
Tube stations in the London Borough of Wandsworth
Former City and South London Railway stations
Railway stations in Great Britain opened in 1926
Charles Holden railway stations
Art Deco architecture in London
Clapham
London Underground Night Tube stations
Art Deco railway stations